The Glasebach is a stream of Saxony-Anhalt, Germany.

It rises near Dietersdorf east of the source region of the Nasse and south of the source region of the Schöneberger Wipper, a headstream of the Wipper. The Glasebach flows through the Borntal valley and has a tributary near . Finally it flows through the Bauerngraben, where it seeps into the gypsum in the southern part of the lake basin.

See also
List of rivers of Saxony-Anhalt

Rivers of Saxony-Anhalt
Rivers of Germany